Kennel may refer to:

 Kennel, a breeding kennel or boarding kennel
 Kennel, a doghouse (a small shed for a dog)
 Kennel, a dog crate
 Kennel, a short-term boarding kennel service for dogs aka dog daycare
 Kennel, the AS-1 Kennel missile
 The Kennel, the nickname of the Charlotte Y. Martin Centre, a sports venue at Gonzaga University in the United States
 Kennel, an obsolete term for a gutter at the edge of a street, or an open sewer

See also
 Kennel club
 Kendal (disambiguation)